The Natural History Museum of Aschaffenburg is a natural history museum located in the historical Schönborner Hof in Aschaffenburg, Bavaria, Germany.

Since 1970 the museum has been housed in the former city palace of the Counts of Schönborn (built 1681), and currently contains a mineral collection, extensive butterfly collection, taxidermic collection of regional fauna, and herbarium (established 1900).

See also 
 List of botanical gardens in Germany

External links 
 Municipal museums Aschaffenburg
 Zentralregister biologischer Forschungssammlungen in Deutschland

Aschaffenburg, Naturwissenschaftlichen Museum
Aschaffenburg
Museums in Bavaria